Verbesina petrobioides is a species of flowering plant in the family Asteraceae. It is found only in Jamaica.

References

petrobioides
Near threatened plants
Endemic flora of Jamaica
Taxonomy articles created by Polbot